Debt ceiling crisis may refer to:
 United States debt-ceiling crisis of 1995
 United States debt-ceiling crisis of 2011
 United States debt-ceiling crisis of 2013
 United States debt-ceiling crisis of 2023